Major Alfred Cecil Herring  (26 October 1888 – 10 August 1966) was an English recipient of the Victoria Cross, the highest and most prestigious award for gallantry in the face of the enemy that can be awarded to British and Commonwealth forces.

Early life
Alfred Cecil Herring was educated at Tottenham County School where he was captain of the school at cricket and football.

Details
He was 29 years old, and a temporary second lieutenant in the Royal Army Service Corps, British Army, attached to  6th (S) Battalion, The Northamptonshire Regiment during the First World War when the following deed took place for which he was awarded the VC.

On 23/24 March 1918 at Montagne Bridge, France, the enemy had gained a position on the south bank of the canal and Second Lieutenant Herring's post was surrounded, but he immediately counter-attacked and recaptured the position, together with 20 prisoners and six machine-guns. During the night the post was continually attacked, but all attacks were beaten off, largely because Lieutenant Herring was frequently visiting his men and cheering them up. It was owing to his bravery and magnificent handling of his troops that the enemy advance was held up for 11 hours at a very critical period.

Further information
He was born in Tottenham, North London.
He later achieved the rank of major.  He was a Chartered Accountant by profession 

In 2006, a new pub on Green Lanes, Palmers Green, in North London, run by the Wetherspoons chain, was named after him.

The medal
His Victoria Cross is displayed at the New Royal Logistic Corps Museum, RHQ The RLC, Building 204, Worthy Down Barracks, Winchester. SO21 2RG. (date 2021) signed KMB

References and sources
References

Sources
Monuments to Courage (David Harvey, 1999)
The Register of the Victoria Cross (This England, 1997)
VCs of the First World War - Spring Offensive 1918 (Gerald Gliddon, 1997)

External links
Location of grave and VC medal (Woking Crematorium)

1888 births
1966 deaths
Royal Army Service Corps officers
British World War I recipients of the Victoria Cross
British Army personnel of World War I
People from Tottenham
British World War I prisoners of war
World War I prisoners of war held by Germany
British Army recipients of the Victoria Cross
Military personnel from London